Beat Müller (born 8 February 1978 in Bern) is a Swiss sport shooter. He won a bronze medal in the men's 300 m rifle prone (300FR60PR) at the 2008 European Shooting Championships in Granada, Spain, accumulating a score of 599 points. Muller is also a member of Sportschützen Taters, and is coached and trained by former Olympian Wolfram Waibel Jr. of Austria.

Muller represented Switzerland at the 2008 Summer Olympics, where he competed in the men's 50 m rifle 3 positions, along with his teammate Marcel Bürge. He was able to shoot 395 targets in a prone position, 380 in standing, and 389 in kneeling, for a total score of 1,164 points, finishing only in twenty-first place.

At the 2010 ISSF World Shooting Championships, he won a gold medal the 300m standard rifle team event, along with teammates Marcel Bürge and Olivier Schaffter.

References

External links
NBC Olympics Profile

1978 births
Swiss male sport shooters
Living people
Olympic shooters of Switzerland
Shooters at the 2008 Summer Olympics
Sportspeople from Bern